The Best of Peggy Lee: The Capitol Years is a 1997 (see 1997 in music) compilation album by Peggy Lee released on the Blue Note Records label.

Track listing
"Why Don't You Do Right" 2:29
"For Every Man, There's A Woman" 2:49
"Fever" 3:23
"Alright, Okay, You Win" 2:23
"Blue Prelude" 2:18
"Hallelujah, I Love Him So" 2:31
"Just For A Thrill" 3:43
"Goin' To Chicago" 2:37
"I'm A Woman" 2:11
"See See Rider" 2:38
"You Don't Know" 2:30
"Call Me" 2:36
"Whisper Not" 2:20
"The Thrill Is Gone" 3:36
"Seventh Son" 2:25
"Please Send Me Someone To Love" 4:11
"Mama's Gone, Goodbye" 2:37
"I'm Gonna Go Fishin'" 2:07

External links
The Best of Peggy Lee: The Capitol Years at Blue Note Records

1997 greatest hits albums
Peggy Lee albums
Blue Note Records compilation albums